Khashayar Etemadi (born March 31, 1971) is an Iranian singer. He is the singer of the first pop music album in Iran after the revolution.

Biography 
He was born in Tehran on April 3, 1981. At the age of 4, he learned to work with Melodica and at the age of 5, he learned to play the accordion. Etemadi started singing at the age of 6 and started learning and playing the piano at the age of 13. Khashayar Etemadi started working in the field of music at the age of fifteen. In 1974, he entered the world of music with the secret of Hafez and became famous by singing the song "Baron" with a poem by Ahmad Shamlou. Etemadi has performed extensively and participated in three festivals, including the Pop Festival, two international festivals in Iran, and the Sarajevo W.O.M.F International Muslim Music Festival. He is a graduate of Business Economics.

Among the songwriters who have worked with Khashayar Etemadi, we can mention the following people:

Afshin Yadollahi, Roozbeh Bemani, Maryam Delshad, Akbar Azad, Afshin Siahpoosh, Afshin Moghadam, Babak Sahraei, Fatemeh Jafari, Maryam Heydarzadeh and Pouya Kasra.

Discography

Albums 

 Leila
 Dilshoreh (1998)
 Remember
 Your lady
 like nobody
 Taene
 He fell in love with everyone
 God forgive you
 I have to go back to you
 You are doomed to return

Singles 

 You thought late
 please
 I came back
 I have one word left in my heart
 Perennial love
 Beht (with Yasser Davoudian)
 Associate
 Game Cum
 Why are you so beautiful
 Just ask me
 Letter
 Appreciation
 Ali (AS)
 Bam earthquake
 Keshavarz (3 songs)

References 

Living people
1971 births
Iranian pop singers
21st-century Iranian male singers
20th-century Iranian male singers